Liu Shuang is a Chinese paralympic rower. She participated at the 2016 Summer Paralympics in the rowing competition, being awarded the silver medal in the mixed double sculls event with her teammate, Fein Tianming. Shuang also participated at the 2020 Summer Paralympics in the rowing competition, being awarded the bronze medal in the mixed double sculls event with her teammate, Jiang Jijian.

References

External links 
Paralympic Games profile

Living people
Place of birth missing (living people)
Year of birth missing (living people)
Chinese female rowers
Rowers at the 2016 Summer Paralympics
Rowers at the 2020 Summer Paralympics
Medalists at the 2016 Summer Paralympics
Medalists at the 2020 Summer Paralympics
Paralympic medalists in rowing
Paralympic rowers of China
Paralympic silver medalists for China
Paralympic bronze medalists for China